In the mathematical subject of group theory, the Stallings theorem about ends of groups states that a finitely generated group  has more than one end if and only if the group  admits a nontrivial decomposition as an amalgamated free product or an HNN extension over a finite subgroup. In the modern language of Bass–Serre theory the theorem says that a finitely generated group  has more than one end if and only if  admits a nontrivial (that is, without a global fixed point) action on a simplicial tree with finite edge-stabilizers and without edge-inversions.

The theorem was proved by John R. Stallings, first in the torsion-free case (1968) and then in the general case (1971).

Ends of graphs

Let  be a connected graph where the degree of every vertex is finite. One can view  as a topological space by giving it the natural structure of a one-dimensional cell complex. A more explicit definition of the number of ends of a graph is presented below for completeness.

Let  be a non-negative integer. The graph  is said to satisfy  if for every finite collection  of edges of  the graph  has at most  infinite connected components. By definition,  if  and if for every  the statement  is false. Thus  if  is the smallest nonnegative integer  such that . If there does not exist an integer  such that , put .

Ends of groups

Let  be a finitely generated group.

Basic facts and examples
For a finitely generated group  we have  if and only if  is finite.
For the infinite cyclic group  we have 
For the free abelian group of rank two  we have 
For a free group  where  we have .

Freudenthal-Hopf theorems
Hans Freudenthal and independently Heinz Hopf established in the 1940s the following two facts: 
For any finitely generated group  we have .
For any finitely generated group  we have  if and only if  is virtually infinite cyclic (that is,  contains an infinite cyclic subgroup of finite index).
Charles T. C. Wall proved in 1967 the following complementary fact:
A group  is virtually infinite cyclic if and only if it has a finite normal subgroup  such that  is either infinite cyclic or infinite dihedral.

Cuts and almost invariant sets

Note that by definition .

An ordered pair  is called a cut in  if  is finite.

Cuts and ends
A simple but important observation states:

 if and only if there exists at least one essential cut  in Γ.

Cuts and splittings over finite groups

It is not hard to see that  is an essential cut in Γ so that .

A more precise version of this argument shows that for a finitely generated group :  

Stallings' theorem shows that the converse is also true.

Formal statement of Stallings' theorem
Let  be a finitely generated group.

Then  if and only if one of the following holds:

In the language of Bass–Serre theory this result can be restated as follows:
For a finitely generated group  we have   if and only if  admits a nontrivial (that is, without a global fixed vertex) action on a simplicial tree with finite edge-stabilizers and without edge-inversions.

For the case where  is a torsion-free finitely generated group, Stallings' theorem implies that  if and only if  admits a proper free product decomposition  with both  and  nontrivial.

Applications and generalizations
Among the immediate applications of Stallings' theorem was a proof by Stallings of a long-standing conjecture that every finitely generated group of cohomological dimension one is free and that every torsion-free virtually free group is free. 
Stallings' theorem also implies that the property of having a nontrivial splitting over a finite subgroup is a quasi-isometry invariant of a finitely generated group since the number of ends of a finitely generated group is easily seen to be a quasi-isometry invariant. For this reason Stallings' theorem is considered to be one of the first results in geometric group theory. 
Stallings' theorem was a starting point for Dunwoody's accessibility theory. Dunwoody proved that every finitely presented group is accessible but that there do exist finitely generated groups that are not accessible. Linnell showed that if one bounds the size of finite subgroups over which the splittings are taken then every finitely generated group is accessible in this sense as well. These results in turn gave rise to other versions of accessibility such as Bestvina-Feighn accessibility of finitely presented groups (where the so-called "small" splittings are considered), acylindrical accessibility, strong accessibility, and others.
Stallings' theorem is a key tool in proving that a finitely generated group  is virtually free if and only if  can be represented as the fundamental group of a finite graph of groups where all vertex and edge groups are finite (see, for example,). 
Using Dunwoody's accessibility result, Stallings' theorem about ends of groups and the fact that if  is a finitely presented group with asymptotic dimension 1 then  is virtually free one can show  that for a finitely presented word-hyperbolic group  the hyperbolic boundary of  has topological dimension zero if and only if  is virtually free.   
Relative versions of Stallings' theorem and relative ends of finitely generated groups with respect to subgroups have also been considered. Early work on semi-splittings, inspired by Stallings' theorem, was done in the 1970s and 1980s by Scott, Swarup, and others. The work of Sageev and Gerasimov in the 1990s showed that for a subgroup  the condition  corresponds to the group  admitting an essential isometric action on a CAT(0)-cubing where a subgroup commensurable with  stabilizes an essential "hyperplane" (a simplicial tree is an example of a CAT(0)-cubing where the hyperplanes are the midpoints of edges). Another situation where an actual splitting can be obtained (modulo a few exceptions) is for semi-splittings over virtually polycyclic subgroups. Here the case of semi-splittings of word-hyperbolic groups over two-ended (virtually infinite cyclic) subgroups was treated by Scott-Swarup and by Bowditch. The case of semi-splittings of finitely generated groups with respect to virtually polycyclic subgroups is dealt with by the algebraic torus theorem of Dunwoody-Swenson.
 
A number of new proofs of Stallings' theorem have been obtained by others after Stallings' original proof. Dunwoody gave a proof based on the ideas of edge-cuts. Later Dunwoody also gave a proof of Stallings' theorem for finitely presented groups using the method of "tracks" on finite 2-complexes. Niblo obtained a proof of Stallings' theorem as a consequence of Sageev's CAT(0)-cubing relative version, where the CAT(0)-cubing is eventually promoted to being a tree. It is also possible to prove Stallings' theorem for finitely presented groups using Riemannian geometry techniques of minimal surfaces, where one first realizes a finitely presented group as the fundamental group of a compact -manifold (see, for example, a sketch of this argument in the survey article of Wall). Gromov outlined a proof (see pp. 228–230 in ) where the minimal surfaces argument is replaced by an easier harmonic analysis argument and this approach was pushed further by Kapovich to cover the original case of finitely generated groups.

See also
Free product with amalgamation
HNN extension
Bass–Serre theory
Graph of groups
Geometric group theory

Notes

Geometric group theory
Theorems in group theory